Poecilocharis are a genus of very large, air-breathing land snails, terrestrial pulmonate gastropod molluscs in the family Bothriembryontidae.

Species
 Poecilocharis bicolor (Hartman, 1889)
 Poecilocharis turneri (L. Pfeiffer, 1860)

References

 Neubert, E., Chérel-Mora C. & Bouchet P. (2009). Polytypy, clines, and fragmentation: The bulimes of New Caledonia revisited (Pulmonata, Orthalicoidea, Placostylidae). In P. Grancolas (ed.), Zoologia Neocaledonica 7. Biodiversity studies in New Caledonia. Mémoires du Muséum National d'Histoire Naturelle. 198: 37-131

External links
 Kobelt, W. (1890-1891). Die Gattung Placostylus Beck. (Bulimus. Neue Folge). In: Küster, H. C.; Kobelt, W., Eds. Systematisches Conchylien-Cabinet von Martini und Chemnitz. Neu herausgegeben und vervollständigt. Ersten Bandes dreizehnte Abtheilung A. 1-142, pls 1-32. Nürnberg: Bauer & Raspe

 
Gastropod genera